Andrew Anthony "Peaches" Nelson (November 30, 1884 – unknown) was a pitcher in Major League Baseball. He played for the Chicago White Sox in 1908.

References

External links

1884 births
Year of death missing
Major League Baseball pitchers
Chicago White Sox players
Des Moines Boosters players
Fond du Lac Giants players
Baseball players from Saint Paul, Minnesota